Hebert Wells Ice Arena is a 600-seat plus ice arena in College Park, Maryland, USA. Herbert Wells Ice Rink is open for ice skating seasonally, from October through March. This ice skating facility includes the rink, an indoor warming room and party room, and a snack bar.

External links
 Hebert Wells Ice Arena

Sports venues in Maryland
Indoor arenas in Maryland